Alon Mizrahi (born 22 November 1971) is an Israeli former professional footballer who played for clubs including Nice, Maccabi Tel Aviv, Hapoel Tel Aviv, Hapoel Be'er Sheva, Maccabi Haifa and Beitar Jerusalem.

His nickname is The Airplane, referring to the movement he used to do after scoring a goal.

Personal life
His father, Amos Mizrahi was also a footballer who played in Bnei Yehuda in the 1950s and 1960s and was part of the team that won the State Cup in 1968.

International career

International goals
Scores and results list Israel's goal tally first, score column indicates score after each Mizrahi goal.

Personal achievements
 Mizrahi was the top scorer of the UEFA Cup Winners' Cup in seasons 1993-94 and 1998-99.
 Mizrahi scored 206 goals in the Israeli Premier League. Mizrahi broke the scoring record of the Israeli legendary striker Oded Machnes and became the greatest goal-scorer in Israeli history.
 Mizrahi has maintained an impressive strike rate, of a goal in every two games, throughout his career.
 Mizrahi won four times the "Goal King" title, awarded to the player who scores the most in the premier league season. He won the title twice with Bnei Yehuda and twice with Maccabi Haifa.
 Mizrahi won 2 championships (with Bnei Yehuda and with Maccabi Haifa), 1 cup (with Maccabi Haifa) and participated twice in the Cup Winners' Cup (with Maccabi Haifa) and Peace Cup (with Beitar Jerusalem).
 Mizrahi scored 28 goals in 1993–94 for Maccabi Haifa. This is a (shared) Israeli record of goals per season in the Israeli Premier League.
 Mizrahi scored 15 goals in European club competitions.

Honours
Bnei Yehuda
Israeli Premier League: 1988–89
Toto Cup: 1991–92, 1996–97

Maccabi Haifa
Israeli Premier League: 1993–94
State Cup: 1997–98
Toto Cup: 1993–94

Individual
Israeli Premier League top goalscorer: 1991–92, 1992–93, 1993–94, 1997–97
UEFA Cup Winners' Cup top goalscorer: 1993–94, 1998–99

References

External links

1971 births
Living people
Israeli Jews
Israeli footballers
Bnei Yehuda Tel Aviv F.C. players
Hapoel Tel Aviv F.C. players
Maccabi Haifa F.C. players
Maccabi Tel Aviv F.C. players
Maccabi Ironi Ashdod F.C. players
OGC Nice players
Beitar Jerusalem F.C. players
Hapoel Kfar Saba F.C. players
Maccabi Ahi Nazareth F.C. players
Hapoel Be'er Sheva F.C. players
Maccabi Ironi Amishav Petah Tikva F.C. players
Hapoel Kfar Saba F.C. managers
Hapoel Petah Tikva F.C. managers
Expatriate footballers in France
Israeli expatriate sportspeople in France
Association football forwards
Israel international footballers
Israeli football managers
Israel youth international footballers
Israel under-21 international footballers
Israeli Football Hall of Fame inductees